Bireuën Regency is a regency of Aceh, the westernmost province of Indonesia. It is located on the island of Sumatra. The capital is Bireuën, 105 miles east of the provincial capital, Banda Aceh. The regency covers an area of 1,798.25 square kilometres and had a population of 340,271 people according to the 2000 Census; at the 2010 Census it had a population of 389,288, which had risen to 436,418 at the 2020 Census; the official estimate as at mid 2021 was 439,788. It is bordered by the Strait of Malacca on the northeast coastline. Bireuen has been affected by the clashes between the Free Aceh Movement (GAM) and the government.

The regency's name, however, is commonly spelled without the diaeresis on the letter Ë: Kabupaten Bireuen (in Acehnese, Ë represents a schwa in diphthongs). It was affected by the Indian Ocean earthquake and tsunami on 26 December 2004.

Administrative districts 

The regency is divided administratively into seventeen districts (kecamatan), tabulated below with their areas and their populations at the 2010 Census and the 2020 Census, together with the official estimates as at mid 2021. The table also includes the locations of the district administrative centres, the number of villages (rural desa and urban kelurahan) in each district, and its post code.

References 

Regencies of Aceh